WDNZ-LD (channel 11), branded on air as WDNZ-TV 11, is a low-powered digital primary MyNetworkTV and secondary BizTV/Antenna TV-affiliated television station serving Bowling Green, Kentucky, United States that is licensed to Glasgow. The station is owned by the Daily News Broadcasting Company, alongside radio stations WKCT and WDNS. The owners of the station holds the license for the television station as News Television, LLC. The television and radio stations share studios located at the Daily News building on College Street in downtown Bowling Green. WDNZ's transmitter is located behind the studio.

History

Under Frank Digital ownership
Under original ownership by Frank Digital Broadcasting, the station’s first construction permit was issued by the Federal Communications Commission on February 22, 2011 under the callsign W11DJ-D. The station has been silent, but the station could be the market’s third low-powered television station after WCZU-LD and W14DG-D, the latter of which was initially only on the air for a month in 2016. The station would also be the first television station of any kind to be licensed in Glasgow since 2010, when former Trinity Broadcasting Network (TBN) owned-and-operated translators WKUT-LP and WKUW-LP went off the air due to lack of viewer support; both of them relocated to serve the Louisville and Nashville markets, respectively. The licenses of both WKUT and WKUW were first sold to Budd Broadcasting in 2010, and then to DTV America Corporation in the mid-2010s, and as of 2017, they, along with WCZU, are now owned by INNOVATE Corp..

New ownership
In 2018, the FCC issued a Special temporary authority license to the then-W11DJ-D’s new licensee, News Publishing, LLC, which is a wholly owned subsidiary of the Daily News Broadcasting Company of Bowling Green. The Daily News also owns two radio stations: news/talk AM station WKCT, along with its associated translator W281BV, and classic rock-formatted FM sister station WDNS. The special temporary authority license would allow it to conduct test broadcasts from a former AT&T long-lines microwave tower near Brownsville, with the directional antenna orienting the signal to the south to not only cover the city of Bowling Green proper, but also to protect the full-power signal of Louisville’s ABC affiliate WHAS-TV, which also broadcasts on channel 11, from co-channel interference. However, the station also has a construction permit to instead transmit from the WDNS radio transmission tower located in southeastern Warren County on Iron Bridge Road just off Kentucky Route 1402 (KY 1402) west of Threeforks. If it begins broadcasting at that location, the projected signal coverage would cover almost all of the Bowling Green media market area, plus central and southern portions of Grayson County (part of the Louisville market), and nearby portions of northern Allen County (part of the Nashville market) located within a few miles from that county’s northern boundary. The signal would be oriented west to east, but also have limited coverage to the north to also protect the signal of WHAS-TV.

Sign on and MyNetworkTV affiliation takeover
The station adapted its current WDNZ-LD callsign on October 8, 2019. In June 2019, the Antenna TV network’s website listed the station as Bowling Green’s upcoming Antenna TV affiliate after WCZU-LD dropped both of its Antenna TV and MyNetworkTV affiliations in favor of the newly-resurrected Court TV. It was announced that WDNZ will take over both of WCZU’s former main-channel affiliations; MyNetworkTV on its main channel, with its DT2 subchannel carrying the full Antenna TV schedule, and Biz TV on a third subchannel. Along with that information, the station has applied for special temporary authority to temporarily transmit the signal on UHF channel 31 from a small tower behind the WDNS/WKCT/W281BV studios on College Street in downtown Bowling Green while the permanent transmission facility near Threeforks is being built. This could happen after religious independent station WPBM-CD in nearby Scottsville, Kentucky, which originally transmit on channel 31, moves their digital allocation to channel 15 on October 18, 2019.

Upon the station's sign-on, WDNZ initially broadcast four digital subchannels, carrying a mixture of MyNetworkTV, Biz TV and Antenna TV programming on the main channel, with Stadium on DT2, and the full-time schedules of Biz TV and Antenna TV on DT3 and DT4, respectively. In 2020, Biz TV was replaced with The Country Network on the DT3 subchannel. Two other subchannels were launched to provide a visual simulcast of WKCT on a fifth subchannel, displayed as virtual channel 9.30, and Estrella TV on a DT6 subchannel, displayed as 12.1, thus making WDNZ the first Bowling Green station to offer a Spanish-language network.  

As of July 5, 2022, the station holds an application to relocate its signal to VHF channel 8.

Digital television

Digital channels
The station's digital signal is multiplexed:

References

External links
Bowling Green Daily News

 
 

Low-power television stations in the United States
MyNetworkTV affiliates
Antenna TV affiliates
The Country Network affiliates
Stadium (sports network) affiliates
Estrella TV affiliates
Mass media in Bowling Green, Kentucky
DNZ-LD
Television channels and stations established in 2019
Glasgow, Kentucky